Mary Ann Venables was a left-handed British fencer. She won a bronze medal in the individual foil event at the 1930 World Fencing Championships.

In 1930 she also won the Baptiste Bertrand Cup.

References

Date of birth missing
Date of death missing
British female foil fencers